HAT-P-24 is an F8 dwarf star about 400 parsecs away. A planet was discovered with the transit method by the HATNet Project in 2010. HAT-P-24b, is a typical hot Jupiter orbiting in only 3 days.

Planetary system
In 2010 the HATNet Project announced the discovery of a hot jupiter type gas giant extrasolar planet in orbit around this star. Following the designation scheme used by the HATNet Project, the star is designated as HAT-P-24, and the planet itself HAT-P-24b.

References

External links
 http://www.astro.keele.ac.uk/jkt/tepcat/planets/HAT-P-24.html
 http://exoplanet.eu/star.php?st=HAT-P-24
 http://www.odyssespace.fr/exoplanetes-liste.php

F-type main-sequence stars
Planetary systems with one confirmed planet
Planetary transit variables
Gemini (constellation)